Estadio Osvaldo Casanova is an indoor sporting arena that is located in Bahía Blanca, Buenos Aires, Argentina. The arena is mainly used to host basketball and volleyball games. The arena's seating capacity for basketball games is 3,950.

History
Construction on Estadio Osvaldo Casanova began in 1928, and it was originally opened in 1932. However, the original arena was restructured, and it re-opened in 1939. Over the years, the arena has undergone several renovations. 

The arena hosted the 2011 FIVB Volleyball Boys' U19 World Championship and the 2015 FIBA Americas Under-16 Championship. The arena was used as a host venue of the 2017 FIBA AmeriCup.

References

External links
Interior Image of Estadio Osvaldo Casanova

Basketball venues in Argentina
Indoor arenas in Argentina
Sports venues completed in 1939
Sports venues in Argentina